= The Pirates of Manhattan =

Book on American finance

- Pirates of Manhattan book cover
- Author: Barry Dyke
- Language: English
- Genre: Finance
- Publisher: 555 Publishing
- Publication date: 2007
- Publication place: United States
- Media type: Print
- ISBN: 0-9793177-0-3
- Followed by: The Pirates of Manhattan II: Highway to Serfdom

The Pirates of Manhattan is a book on American finance written by author Barry Dyke.

== Overview ==
It presents arguments that mutual funds and the stock market are not looking out for the consumer and takes the position that permanent life insurance is the best investment one can make, citing examples of people and companies who have used life insurance to their benefit and profit.
